Seantavius Jones (born August 9, 1992) is an American football wide receiver for the Jefes de Ciudad Juárez of the Liga de Fútbol Americano Profesional (LFA). Before that he was a member of the Ottawa Redblacks, of the Canadian Football League (CFL). He was signed by the New Orleans Saints as an undrafted free agent in 2014. He played college football at Valdosta State. Jones has been a member of teams in six different football leagues: NFL, AAF, XFL, ELF, CFL and LFA.

Professional career

New Orleans Saints
On May 12, 2014, Jones was signed as an undrafted free agent by the New Orleans Saints. On August 30, 2014, he was waived by the Saints and signed to the practice squad two days later. On December 11, 2014, he was promoted to the active roster from the practice squad.

On September 5, 2015, Jones was cut by the Saints, but was signed to the team's practice squad the next day. On September 12, 2015, he was promoted to the active roster and was active for the 2015 opener against the Arizona Cardinals. On September 14, 2015, he was released by the Saints, but was re-signed to the practice squad two days later. On December 24, 2015, the Saints promoted Jones to the 53-man roster. On February 8, 2016, he was cut by the Saints.

Philadelphia Eagles
On February 18, 2016, Jones signed with the Philadelphia Eagles. He was released on April 4, 2016.

Kansas City Chiefs
Jones was signed by the Kansas City Chiefs. On August 28, 2016, Jones was waived by the Chiefs. On September 4, he was signed to the Chiefs' practice squad. He signed a reserve/future contract with the Chiefs on January 19, 2017. He was waived on September 2, 2017.

Indianapolis Colts
On January 2, 2018, Jones signed a reserve/future contract with the Indianapolis Colts. He was waived on September 1, 2018.

Atlanta Legends
On October 12, 2018, Jones signed with the Atlanta Legends of the Alliance of American Football. He recorded 24 catches for 298 yards by the time the league ceased operations in April 2019.

Tampa Bay Vipers
In October 2019, Jones was selected by the Tampa Bay Vipers in the 2020 XFL Draft. He was waived on February 19, 2020, and re-signed on February 25. He had his contract terminated when the league suspended operations on April 10, 2020.

Berlin Thunder
He signed with the Berlin Thunder (ELF) for the new European League of Football's inaugural 2021 season.

Ottawa Redblacks
Jones signed with the Ottawa Redblacks of the Canadian Football League (CFL) on January 25, 2022. Jones was released as part of the team's final roster cuts on June 4, 2022.

Leipzig Kings
On June 9, 2022 the Kings franchise of the European League of Football announced the signing of Jones for a two-year contract as a replacement for injured running back David McCants. This marks his second stint in the two years of the ELF.

Jefes de Ciudad Juárez
On February 12, 2023, the Jefes de Ciudad Juárez of the Liga de Fútbol Americano Profesional (LFA) of Mexico announced the signing of Jones for the 2023 LFA season.

References

External links
 Valdosta State Blazers bio
 New Orleans Saints bio
 Ottawa Redblacks bio

Living people
1992 births
African-American players of American football
People from Tucker, Georgia
Players of American football from Georgia (U.S. state)
Sportspeople from DeKalb County, Georgia
American football wide receivers
Tucker High School alumni
Valdosta State Blazers football players
New Orleans Saints players
Philadelphia Eagles players
Kansas City Chiefs players
Indianapolis Colts players
Atlanta Legends players
Tampa Bay Vipers players
Ottawa Redblacks
Berlin Thunder players
Leipzig Kings players
Jefes de Ciudad Juárez players
21st-century African-American sportspeople
American expatriate players of American football
American expatriate sportspeople in Germany
American expatriate sportspeople in Mexico